Auchterderran is a village in Fife, Scotland. It is sometimes thought as part of the larger village, Cardenden, although Cardenden is part of the parish of Auchterderran.

The name derives from Scottish Gaelic, although the first element, urchan, is obsolete in modern Gaelic and obscure. The second element, deòradh, means "a person charged with the safe-keeping of a saintly relic".

Church

A church existed here since Pre-Reformation times. The current church dates from 1789 and was extended in 1891.

Notable residents
Dr Thomas Goodall Nasmyth FRSE MOH born here in 1855.

References

Villages in Fife
Civil parishes of Scotland
Parishes in Fife
Mining communities in Fife
Cardenden